Cape Coast Sports Stadium is a multi-use stadium in Cape Coast, Central Region, Ghana. It is used mostly for football matches and is the home stadium of Ebusua Dwarfs. The stadium holds 20,000 people.

Stadium etymology

Construction
Cape Coast Sports Stadium; It was designed by the China IPPR International Engineering Corporation led by architect Zhou Jun.

Stadium features
The stadium features a 300 car parking capacity, two basketball fields, a handball court and tennis court, and an indoor facility that can be used for any indoor games.

Stadium complex
The stadium complex has a 22-room hostel facility, a canteen, kitchen, fire-fighting room, storage rooms among others. It was designed by the China IPPR International Engineering Corporation led by architect Zhou Jun.

External links and sources
		 
 MoU signed with Chinese Government for Cape Coast Stadium	 
IPPR Winning Bidder for Cape Coast Stadium Project – Sinomach

Cape Coast
Football venues in Ghana
2016 establishments in Ghana
Sports venues completed in 2016